Shoemaker crater may refer to:

Shoemaker crater (aka Teague Ring) in Australia
Shoemaker (lunar crater) at the south pole of the Moon
Shoemaker crater (433 Eros), a proposed name for an impact feature on the asteroid Eros, now formally named Charlois Regio

See also
 Shoemaker (disambiguation)